Ras-related protein Rab-11B is a protein that in humans is encoded by the RAB11B gene. Rab11b is reported as most abundantly expressed in brain, heart and testes.

Rab (Ras-related in brain) proteins form the largest section of the Ras superfamily of small GTPases. The Rab family proteins regulate intracellular membrane trafficking processes including vesicle budding, tethering, and fusion. The isoforms Rab11a, Rab11b, and Rab11c/Rab25 constitute the Rab11 subfamily based on specific sequence motifs. While RAB11A is located on chromosome 15 and RAB11C on chromosome 1, RAB11B is placed on chromosome 19. Rab11 proteins are implicated in endocytosis and exocytosis. Rab11b is reported as most abundantly expressed in brain, heart and testes. Early studies with deletions of RAB11 homologs in Saccharomyces cerevisiae proved their importance in cell survival.
Despite sharing high sequence homology, Rab11a and Rab11b appear to reside within distinct vesicle compartments. Majority of Rab11b neither colocalize with transferrin receptor nor with the polymeric IgA receptor. This protein also exhibits a dependence on the microtubule cytoskeleton that is different from Rab11a. High sequence diversity in the C-terminal hypervariable region is responsible for variable membrane targeting between these proteins.

Function 

Members of the Rab11 subfamily act in recycling of proteins from the endosomes to the plasma membrane, in transport of molecules from the trans-Golgi network to the plasma membrane and in phagocytosis. This subfamily also acts in polarized transport in epithelial cells. Whereas most studies refer to the Rab11a isoform, little is known about Rab11b so far. Rab11b localizes predominantly in the pericentriolar recycling compartment and serves as an important component of the vesicular machinery. It is required for the transfer of internalized transferrin from the recycling compartment to the plasma membrane for which active Rab11b as well as GTP hydrolysis is necessary.

Structure 

All Ras GTPases consist of a similar core structure and highly conserved P-loop, switch 1 and switch 2 regions. The Rab11b monomer exhibits a typical Ras-like, small GTPase fold with a six stranded β-sheet core (β1-β6) surrounded by five major α-helices (α1-α5) and one minor α-helix (α6). According to the sequence similarity to other Rab GTPases can be assumed that they show closely resembling characteristics in nucleotide binding and hydrolysis. However, Rab11 isoforms could differ in hydrolysis kinetics owing to the differences in conformation, since Rab11a and Rab11b do not show an α-helical switch 2 region like other Rab GTPases.  Rab11b shares 90% amino acid identity to Rab11a. Kinetic experiments with Rab11a/b and Rab11-interacting proteins (FIPs) indicate that FIPs cannot differentiate between GTP-bound Rab11a and Rab11b in vitro. The major divergence reveals in the inactive state. While Pasqualato et al. crystallized inactive Rab11a as a dimer in the asymmetric unit, Scapin et al. observed single crystallographically independent monomers of both the GDP- and the GppNHp-bound Rab11b structures.

Clinical significance 

Due to their crucial importance in vesicle transport and recycling, Rab11 proteins are linked to various non-pathogen or pathogen induced diseases. Most of the published data do not specify whether it is the a- or the b-isoform. Rab11 proteins have been implicated in Alzheimer's disease, Arthrogryposis-renal dysfunction-cholestasis (ARC), Batten disease, and Charcot-Marie-Tooth Neuropathy Type 4C (CMT4C).
Intracellular bacteria Chlamydia pneumoniae and Chlamydia trachomatis that replicate in membrane bound compartments hijack the trafficking machinery recruiting Rab GTPases to promote their replication within the host cell. Knock down of Rab11 decreased the formation of infectious particles.
Recent studies report a similar use of intracellular trafficking by Hantavirus and Influenza A virus. Replicated viruses benefit from Rab11 mediated recycling endosome pathway to exit the cell and infect surrounding tissue.

References

Further reading 

 
 
 
 
 
 
 
 

G proteins
Human proteins